Tidaá Mixtec is a moribund Mixtec language of Oaxaca. It is not close to other varieties of Mixtec.

References 

Languages of Mexico
Oto-Manguean languages
Mixtec language